GAFC may refer to:

Garw Athletic F.C.
Glenafton Athletic F.C.
Grays Athletic F.C.
Gresford Athletic F.C.
Goole A.F.C.
Gorleston F.C.
Gornal Athletic F.C.
Guiseley A.F.C.